In philosophical logic, the masked-man fallacy (also known as the intensional fallacy or epistemic fallacy) is committed when one makes an illicit use of Leibniz's law in an argument. Leibniz's law states that if A and B are the same object, then A and B are indiscernible (that is, they have all the same properties). By modus tollens, this means that if one object has a certain property, while another object does not have the same property, the two objects cannot be identical. The fallacy is "epistemic" because it posits an immediate identity between a subject's knowledge of an object with the object itself, failing to recognize that Leibniz's Law is not capable of accounting for intensional contexts.

Examples
The name of the fallacy comes from the example:
 Premise 1: I know who Claus is.
 Premise 2: I do not know who the masked man is.
 Conclusion:  Therefore, Claus is not the masked man.
The premises may be true and the conclusion false if Claus is the masked man and the speaker does not know that. Thus the argument is a fallacious one. 

In symbolic form, the above arguments are
 Premise 1: I know who X is.
 Premise 2: I do not know who Y is.
 Conclusion: Therefore, X is not Y.

Note, however, that this syllogism happens in the reasoning by the speaker "I"; Therefore, in the formal modal logic form, it'll be
 Premise 1: The speaker believes he knows who X is.
 Premise 2: The speaker believes he does not know who Y is.
 Conclusion: Therefore, the speaker believes X is not Y.

It's very likely that this is a false belief:  is likely a false proposition, as the ignorance on the proposition  doesn't imply the negation of it is true.

Another example:
 Premise 1: Lois Lane thinks Superman can fly.
 Premise 2: Lois Lane thinks Clark Kent cannot fly.
 Conclusion: Therefore Superman and Clark Kent are not the same person.

Expressed in doxastic logic, the above syllogism is:
 Premise 1: 
 Premise 2: 
 Conclusion: 

The above reasoning is inconsistent (not truth-preserving). The consistent conclusion should be .

The following similar argument is valid:
 X is Z
 Y is not Z
 Therefore, X is not Y
This is valid because being something is different from knowing (or believing, etc.) something. The valid and invalid inferences can be compared when looking at the invalid formal inference:
 X is Z
 Y is Z, or Y is not Z.
 Therefore, X is not Y.

Intension (with an 's') is the connotation of a word or phrase—in contrast with its extension, the things to which it applies. Intensional sentences are often intentional (with a 't'), that is they involve a relation, unique to the mental, that is directed from concepts, sensations, etc., toward objects.

See also
 Black box
 Eubulides' second paradox
 Identity of indiscernibles
 List of fallacies
 Opaque context
 Transitivity of identity
 Use–mention distinction
 Metonymy

References

Further reading

 
 

Formal fallacies